Orocrambus siriellus is a moth in the family Crambidae. It was described by Edward Meyrick in 1883. This species is endemic to New Zealand, where it has been recorded in Northland to Southland and on the Chatham Islands. It lives in habitat consisting of swampy areas.

The wingspan is 29–34 mm. Adults have been recorded on wing from December to February. The larval host plant of this species is currently unknown. It has been hypothesised that it is likely to be Schoenus brevifolius.

References

Crambinae
Moths described in 1883
Endemic fauna of New Zealand
Moths of New Zealand
Taxa named by Edward Meyrick
Endemic moths of New Zealand